The C-Group culture is an archaeological culture found in Lower Nubia, which dates from ca. 2400 BCE to ca. 1550 BCE. It was named by George A. Reisner. With no central site and no written evidence about what these people called themselves, Reisner assigned the culture a letter. The C-Group arose after Reisner's A-Group and B-Group cultures, and around the time the Old Kingdom was ending in Ancient Egypt.

Overview
While today many scholars see A and B as actually being a continuation of the same group, C-Group is considered as the product of Saharan pastoralist distinct. The C-Group is marked by its distinctive pottery, and for its tombs. Early C-Group tombs consisted of a simple "stone circle" with the body buried in a depression in the centre. The tombs later became more elaborate with the bodies being placed in a stone lined chamber, and then the addition of an extra chamber on the east: for offerings.

The origins of the C-Group are still debated. Some scholars see it largely being evolved from the A/B-Group. Others think it more likely that the C-Group was brought by invaders or migrants that mingled with the local culture, with the C-Group perhaps originating in the then rapidly drying Sahara.

The C-Group were farmers and semi-nomadic herders keeping large numbers of cattle in an area that is today too arid for such herding. Originally they were believed to be a peaceful people due to the lack of weapons in tombs; however, daggers, short swords and battle-axes were found in C-Group graves. Their settling around the forts built by the ancient Egyptians was seen as further evidence.

Most of what is known about the C-Group peoples comes from Lower Nubia and the Dongola Reach. The northern border of the C-Group was around el-Kubanieh near Aswan. The southern border is still uncertain, but C-Group sites have been found as far south as Eritrea.

During the Egyptian Sixth Dynasty, Lower Nubia is described of consisting of a number of small states, three of which are named: Setju, Wawat, and Irjet. At this same time in Upper Nubia the Kingdom of Kerma was emerging. The exact relation between the C-Group and Kerma are uncertain, but early Kerma shows definite similarities to the C-Group culture and the Pan-Grave culture.

Under the Middle Kingdom much of the C-Group lands in Lower Nubia were conquered by Egypt; after the Egyptians left, Kerma expanded north controlling the region. Starting with the conquest of Nubia by Egypt under Tuthmosis I in the late 16th century BCE, the C-Group merged with the Egyptians.

Burial customs 
Early Kerma tumuli were the chosen burial method for Nubians, Pan-graves, and the C-group culture. The C-group tumuli were graves built in a "stone circle" using the "dry stone masonry" technique with an offering chapel decorated with cattle illustrations. However, each culture differed in the structure of the tumuli. The Nubian's tumuli were a shallow round grave and included animal bones. Pan-Grave tumuli were constructed with large black stones and small white stones in an alternating pattern. The C-group culture was pastoral, with cattle being an essential part of their daily activities, funerary practices, and religion. Many "standing slabs" had illustrations of cattle and cattle horns with fine pottery found in the chapel.

In prehistoric times, there had been little distinction between Egyptian and Nubian burial practices, as both were laid in a contracted position in shallow graves. However, as time continues, Nubian cultures continued the contracted body tradition. In contrast, in Egyptian culture, the deceased was placed in an extended position.

As Egypt gained control of Kerma in the New Kingdom, Egyptian culture began to spread throughout Lower Nubia. The C-groups cultures now laid the deceased supine, shown throughout the Ancient Tekhet, Fadrus cemetery.

In the Second Intermediate Period of Egypt, group burials were favored, and this was a trend that was seen in C-group burials. Along with the previously beloved decorations relating to cattle are absent with nearly entirely Egyptian pottery and stone vessels. However, many of their tombs lacked Egyptian funerary goods. The lack of funerary goods could suggest that the C-group's adaptation to Egyptian culture was forced or those buried at Fadrus were simply of "low socioeconomic status."

Language
According to Peter Behrens (1981) and Marianne Bechaus-Gerst (2000), linguistic evidence indicates that the C-Group peoples spoke Afro-Asiatic languages of the Berber branch. This thesis rests on somewhat sketchy and numerically insufficient lexical evidence. Recent evidence suggests that the C-Group peoples spoke an Afro-Asiatic language of the Cushitic branch (with peoples to the south in Upper Nubia possibly speaking Nilo-Saharan languages), and that the closest relative of the C-Group language is the Beja language spoken in the Red Sea coast. Research cannot point to Beja specifically as a descendant language, but rather it is proposed to search in Beja lexical material for the closest common ancestor and thence delineates a related Cushitic language existing in pre-Meroitic Lower Nubia. The disappearance of the C-Group language is somewhat of a mystery. It is possible that with successive phases of Egyptian, Kushite, and Meroitic suzerainty in Lower Nubia that this language became demographically and politically marginalized well before the arrival of Nile Nubian speakers.

Notes

References

History of Nubia
Neolithic cultures of Africa
24th-century BC establishments
2nd-millennium BC disestablishments
Archaeological discoveries with year of discovery missing
Kerma culture
Afroasiatic peoples